Fingerweaving is a Native American art form used mostly to create belts, sashes, straps, and other similar items through a non-loom weaving process.  Unlike loom-based weaving, there is no separation between weft and warp strands, with all strands playing both roles.

North and Central American fingerweaving
Some patterns and color combinations were originally restricted to certain societies or clans, while others were available for general use by all.  Belts, sashes, leg bands, capes, gun straps, even dresses, shirts, and pants were created by the sometimes intricate patterns and methods.  Often beads or feathers were interwoven into the patterns of the articles.

The French Voyagers (fur traders in the northern US and southern Canada) adapted the finger weaving patterns to create belts and sashes which showed which company they belonged to.  The belts were the original weight belts, as they added extra support to their stomachs when they were lifting heavy canoes or packets of beaver pelts, which sometimes weighed up to 600 lbs.

The Spanish conquistadors used fingerwoven sashes to proclaim which command they were in, as well as to record their conquests over the Native Americans.

South American fingerweaving

Although South American styles shared much in common with those from North America, some differences are reliably observable.  In addition to many of the specific weaves from the north, additional styles were created by using multiple weft strands at a time.

Basic weaves

The most basic weave is called a diagonal weave, as it creates a series of parallel lines running down the length of the weave at a diagonal.  Whether one weaves from left to right or from right to left does not matter, as the pattern is the same; however, the direction must stay the same or the pattern will change.

As with loom weaving, one starts with an even number of warp strands, but with no weft strand.  Divide the warp strands into two groups, a top and bottom row.  Take the top left (or top right) strand, and run it between the top and bottom rows, turning it into a weft.  Reverse the position of each warp strand (from top to bottom or bottom to top), making sure to keep all strands in the same order and placement to form a single interlocked row.

For the second row, take the new top left (or top right) warp strand, and tuck it between the top and bottom, forming a new weft strand.  Again, interlink the top and bottom rows, making sure to use the old weft strand from row #1.  Continue this process until the desired length is completed.

Other common but more difficult patterns include those of lightning bolts, arrowheads, and chevrons.  By making slight changes to the weaving process, a wide variety of unique patterns can be created.

References

 
 
 
 
 
 
 
Findley, Gerald Lee (2019) Fingerwoven Sashes BasicTechniques, The book provides detailed instructions for three forms of fingerweaving that were developed by the people of the First Nations,  and the settlers of North America. Amazon print on demand, Paperback  : 193 pages , 

Weaving
Indigenous textile art of the Americas